2 Timothy 2 is the second chapter of the Second Epistle to Timothy  in the New Testament of the Christian Bible. The letter has been traditionally attributed to Paul the Apostle, the last one written in Rome before his death (c. 64 or 67), addressed to Timothy. There are charges that it is the work of an anonymous follower, after Paul's death in the first century AD. This chapter contains the charge to Timothy, to pass on what has been entrusted to him to those who will teach others, to use the message of the gospel to contradict the opponent's teaching, and to counter heterodoxy.

Text
The original text was written in Koine Greek. This chapter is divided into 26 verses.

Textual witnesses
Some early manuscripts containing the text of this chapter are:
Codex Sinaiticus (AD 330–360)
Codex Alexandrinus (400–440)
Codex Ephraemi Rescriptus (c. 450; complete)
Codex Freerianus (c. 450; extant verses 2–5, 14–16, 22–24)
Codex Claromontanus (c. 550)
Codex Coislinianus (c. 550; extant verses 1–9)

Called to Dedication and Faithfulness (2:1–13)
After the initial appeal (in the previous chapter), Paul addresses Timothy's responsibilities in the local church settings.

Verse 3
You therefore must endure hardship as a good soldier of Jesus Christ. 

Verse 10
Therefore I endure everything for the sake of the elect, that they too may obtain the salvation that is in Christ Jesus, with eternal glory.

"The elects": A certain number of persons whom God has chosen in Christ from everlasting to salvation, who will certainly be saved. For these so-called "the chosen vessels of salvation" Jesus Christ suffered and died; and on their account is the Gospel sent and preached to the world, the ministers fitted for their mission and commission; and since it was for the sake of such, whom God had loved and chosen, that Paul endured all persecutions with cheerful consideration which was a support to him.

"The salvation that is in Christ Jesus, with eternal glory": The salvation is only through and in Jesus Christ, and published in the Gospel, for the elects to get it in all ages. It is obtained by Christ for them, through his obedience, sufferings, and death; brought near by the Spirit of God, and applied unto them, so they have now a right to it, and will fully enjoy it in heaven; for it has "eternal glory", or "heavenly glory", as the Vulgate Latin and Ethiopian versions read, "annexed to it", both in soul and body, and remain to all eternity.

Verse 11
It is a faithful saying: For if we be dead with him, we shall also live with him:
"It is a faithful saying": is a formula assuming 'general acceptance' and is stated 5 times in the Pastoral Epistles (1 Timothy 1:15; 3:1; 4:9; 2 Timothy 2:11; Titus 3:8).

Verse 12
If we endure, we shall also reign with Him. If we deny Him, He also will deny us.
If we endure: Revised Standard Version, New International Version
If we suffer: Geneva Bible, King James Version
If we are patient: New Matthew Bible.

If we deny him: , arnēsometha. The manuscript authority requires the future tense: if we shall deny him. The word refers to verbal denial, whereas not believing, with the heart, follows in the next verse. The same fate is expressed in Jesus' words in : Whoever denies Me before men, him I will also deny before My Father who is in heaven.

Addressing the Challenge of Opposition in the Church (2:14–26)
This passage contains a number of commands addressed to Paul's co-worker (in the second person) about how one to teach or relate to those in disputes pertaining heresy. The teaching of Paul was regarded authoritative by Gnostic and anti-Gnostic groups alike in the second century, but this epistle stands out firmly and becomes a basis for anti-Gnostic positions.

Verse 15
Do your best to present yourself to God as one approved, a worker who has no need to be ashamed, rightly handling the word of truth.
 A part of the King James Version of this passage: A Workman That Needeth Not to be Ashamed is the motto for Clarkson University, Potsdam, New York.

Verse 17
And their message will spread like cancer. Hymenaeus and Philetus are of this sort,
"Cancer": or "gangrene"; 'the opposite of "healthy" teaching' (cf. 2 Timothy 1:13).
"Hymenaeus": only mentioned here and in 1 Timothy 1:20.
"Philetus": only mentioned here.

Verse 18
who have strayed concerning the truth, saying that the resurrection is already past; and they overthrow the faith of some.
"Resurrection": from Greek anastasis is considered a "Pauline term" (e.g., by Collins) and, except in Romans 6:5, always written together with nekron (to make "resurrection of the dead" as in 1 Corinthians 15:12, 13, 21, 42) or of the "resurrection of Christ" (Romans 1:4; 6:5; Philippians 3:10). Therefore the lack of any qualifier in this verse indicates that the denial of Hymenaeus and Philetus is of the "resurrection after death".

Verse 19

But the firm foundation of God stands, having this seal, "The Lord knows those who are His," and, "Let everyone who calls on the name of Christ depart from iniquity."

See also
2Tm2,3
Hymenaeus
Jesus Christ
Philetus
Related Bible parts: 2 Corinthians 11, Ephesians 6, 2 Timothy 1

References

Sources

External links
 King James Bible - Wikisource
English Translation with Parallel Latin Vulgate
Online Bible at GospelHall.org (ESV, KJV, Darby, American Standard Version, Bible in Basic English)
Multiple bible versions at Bible Gateway (NKJV, NIV, NRSV etc.)

02